André Blusset (17 January 1904 – 17 July 1994) was a French cross-country skier. He competed in the men's 50 kilometre event at the 1924 Winter Olympics.

References

External links
 

1904 births
1994 deaths
French male cross-country skiers
Olympic cross-country skiers of France
Cross-country skiers at the 1924 Winter Olympics
Place of birth missing
20th-century French people